was a Japanese idol project group formed by Up-Front Promotion in 2000 and associated with Hello! Project. Beginning in 2000, the Shuffle Unit project was a yearly collaboration among existing Hello! Project acts, where members were recombined into three different groups to release a single for each.

After a four-year hiatus, the project was briefly revived in 2009, where several old sub-groups saw a return under new names and new members. After 2009, the project became defunct.

History

2000-2005: Initial beginnings

Beginning in 2000, Tsunku created a music collaboration project with members of Hello! Project rearranged into three separate teams. All groups released their singles on March 8, 2000, with Akagumi 4's single "Akai Nikkichō" charting the highest at #2 on the Oricon Weekly Singles Charts.

All groups released their singles on July 4, 2001, with San-nin Matsuri's single "Chu! Natsu Party" charting the highest at #5 on the Oricon Weekly Singles Charts. All groups released their singles on July 3, 2002, with Sexy 8's single "Shiawase Desu ka?" charting the highest at #2 on the Oricon Weekly Singles Charts.

In 2003, the groups were rearranged under the theme "natural", with the three groups 7 Air, Salt 5, and 11 Water. All groups released their songs as a triple-A-side single on July 9, 2003. The project then took a brief hiatus in 2004, where Tsunku decided to promote all Hello! Project artists as "H.P. All Stars" instead.

Tsunku resumed the Shuffle Unit project in 2005, with groups rearranged under the theme "elegance." Sexy Otona Jan's song "Onna, Kanashii, Otona" was later featured in the 2013 film The Wolverine.

2009: Champloo

On July 15, 2009, Tsunku revived the Shuffle Unit project with a cover album titled Champloo: Happy Marriage Song Cover Shū, describing it as J-pop with the intention of it being played during summer parties and weddings. He named the concept of the Shuffle Units "champloo" to describe the "chaotic" member line-up. The project also saw the revival of inactive or disbanded Hello! The Shuffle Units also released original songs on the Hello! Project's compilation album, Petit Best 10, and performed as concert-only units.

Members

Member lists are adapted from Hello! Project's website:

Timeline

Discography

Albums

Singles

Video singles

Notes

References

External links
 Official Hello! Project shuffle units discography page

Hello! Project
Hello! Project shuffle groups
Japanese idol groups
Japanese pop music groups